Wang Nan (born 22 July 1978 in Zhengzhou, Henan) is a male Chinese sports shooter.

At the 2008 Olympic Games he finished in twelfth place in the double trap qualification, missing a place among the top six, who progressed to the final round.

He also finished second at the 2005 World Championships and first at the 2006 Asian Games.

He belongs to the Henan Provincial Shooting and Archery Administrative Center.

References
 Profile at results.beijing2008.cn
 Profile at 2008teamchina.olympic.cn

1978 births
Living people
Olympic shooters of China
People from Zhengzhou
Shooters at the 2008 Summer Olympics
Trap and double trap shooters
Asian Games medalists in shooting
Sport shooters from Henan
Chinese male sport shooters
Shooters at the 2006 Asian Games
Asian Games gold medalists for China
Medalists at the 2006 Asian Games
21st-century Chinese people